Naane Ennul Illai is a 2010 Tamil-language film written and directed by former actress Jayachitra, starring her son Amresh Ganesh, in his acting debut, and Arya Menon, with Raaghav, Nassar, and Saranya Ponvannan, among others, playing supporting roles. Amresh Ganesh also worked as the film's music composer, besides writing and singing one song. The film, produced by Sendhur Murugan Combines, released to poor reviews.

Cast

 Amresh Ganesh as Amresh
 Arya Menon as Aishwarya
 Raaghav as Ranjith
 Nassar as Vasu
 Saranya Ponvannan as Janaki
 Mohan V. Ram as Natraj
 Lavanya as Vaani
 Radharavi
 Y. Gee. Mahendra
 Visu
 Gurleen Chopra
 Flora Saini
 Kuyili
 Jayachitra
 Sathyapriya
 Bosskey
 K. S. Ravikumar as himself (Guest appearance)
 P. Vasu as himself (Guest appearance)
 K. Bhagyaraj as himself (Guest appearance)
 Gangai Amaran

Soundtrack
The soundtrack was composed by Amresh Ganesh in his debut as both lead actor and composer.

References

External links
 

2010 films
Films set in Chennai
2010s Tamil-language films